Lasaia is a genus of metalmark butterflies in the family Riodinidae. The genus was erected by Henry Walter Bates in 1868. There are about 13 described species in Lasaia, found in North, Central, and South America.

Species
These 13 species belong to the genus Lasaia:

 Lasaia aerugo Clench, 1972
 Lasaia agesilas (Latreille, 1813)
 Lasaia arsis Staudinger, 1888
 Lasaia incoides (Schaus, 1902)
 Lasaia maria Clench, 1971
 Lasaia meris Cramer, 1781
 Lasaia moeros Staudinger, 1888
 Lasaia narses Staudinger, 1888
 Lasaia oileus Godman, 1903
 Lasaia pseudomeris Clench, 1971
 Lasaia scotina Stichel, 1910
 Lasaia sessilis Schaus, 1890
 Lasaia sula Staudinger, 1888 (blue metalmark)

References

Further reading

External links

 

Riodinini